Drifting Along is a 1946 American western film directed by Derwin Abrahams.

Drifting Along may also refer to:
"Drifting Along", song by flamenco-rock band Carmen from Dancing on a Cold Wind 1974 
"Drifting Along", song by Jamiroquai from  Travelling Without Moving